Jordan Michael Fowler (born 1 October 1984) is an English former professional footballer who played in the Football League, as a midfielder.

External links

Profile at Havant & Waterlooville F.C.

1984 births
Living people
Footballers from Barking, London
English footballers
Association football midfielders
Arsenal F.C. players
Chesterfield F.C. players
Dagenham & Redbridge F.C. players
Kettering Town F.C. players
Havant & Waterlooville F.C. players
Bishop's Stortford F.C. players
Harlow Town F.C. players
Hemel Hempstead Town F.C. players
Wingate & Finchley F.C. players
English Football League players